Austrian Grand Prix can refer to:

Austrian Grand Prix, a Formula One motor race
Austrian motorcycle Grand Prix
Speedway Grand Prix of Austria
Styrian Grand Prix, Formula One race held in Styria, Austria